Boulevard Mall is a shopping center located north of the city of Buffalo at the western edge of the Town of Amherst in Erie County, New York, United States. The name derives from its location on Niagara Falls Boulevard (U.S. Route 62), which divides Amherst from the Town of Tonawanda.  Boulevard Mall features a gross leasable area of 904,000 square feet (84,000 m²). The mall currently maintains the traditional chains Macy's, JCPenney, Dick's Sporting Goods, and Gabe's.

The mall is currently being transformed into a state of the art property called Boulevard Place. The 60 year old shopping concourse will become refreshed and feature the addition of an urban boulevard concept with office and residential elements.

Boulevard Mall opened in 1962 as the first indoor shopping center in the Buffalo area.  Since its opening, a large commercial zone has grown up around it.  Because of its proximity to the Canadian border, Boulevard Mall is a frequent destination for Canadian shoppers. JCPenney added a large store in 1970.  A small southern extension was added in 1978, a food court was added in 1994, The mall underwent a major renovation in 1997.

History
The Boulevard Mall opened in 1962, and was the first enclosed shopping center in the Buffalo area. Since its opening, periphery retail surrounding the mall, primarily on Maple Road, Niagara Falls Boulevard, and Sheridan Drive has exploded. Anchored by a large, two-level, 220,000 square foot, Buffalo-based Sattler's and a two-level 80,000 square foot, Lockport-based Jenss, the mall opened with approximately 30 stores and became an immediate attraction to customers . In 1970, JCPenney opened a three-level 180,000 square foot store across from Jenss, and in 1978 the mall was extended on the south end adding approximately 30 more stores. In 1981, Sattlers was bought out by Sibley's of Rochester, who were, in turn, bought out by Pittsburgh based Kaufmann's in 1990. In 1994, the mall underwent a major overhaul as three restaurants, Bonefish Grill, TGI Fridays, and Honey's opened along with the construction of a 9 bay food court on the mall's east side which featured a carousel, a 1990s mall staple. During this makeover, the mall lured many upscale stores such as The Disney Store and Abercrombie and Fitch. Following the opening of the Walden Galleria, seven miles to the south in Cheektowaga in 1989, Boulevard Mall underwent the overhaul to firmly establish itself as the number two mall in Western New York. 

In 1997, the mall again underwent a redesign, this time cosmetically, which saw the implementation of modern skylights, marble floors, columns, and other features aimed at modernizing the complex. In 1998, after over 100 years in business, Jenss filed for bankruptcy and closed their store in the fall. The store was quickly converted into a Kaufmann's Men's Store. In 2000, the mall was expanded once again, this time adding a new wing connected to a two-level, 122,000 square foot Sears. Sears held its grand opening in the fall of 2000, marking the opening of WNY's fifth location.

In September 2006, May Department Stores, owner of Kaufmann's, was purchased by Macy's Inc and all stores became Macy's locations, including the department store and the men's store at the mall. In 2015 the food court was razed to make way for a brand new Dick's Sporting Goods. The store is 58,000 square feet and opened in October of 2015. Food retailers were dispersed throughout the mall, such as Subway and Taste of China. 

In 2019 after changing ownership most of the inline stores left due to the massive development happening at the mall. It was reported the Washington, D.C. based Douglas Jemal purchased the mall and the nearby Wegmans for $30 million. 

Jemal is developing a state of the art property called Boulevard Place. The 60 year old shopping concourse will become refreshed and feature the addition of an urban boulevard concept with office and residential elements.

Future
In 2020, the town of Amherst was seeking a $10 million grant to retro-fit the 60 year old property into an upscale development in anticipation of a future extension of the Buffalo Metro Rail to reach the University at Buffalo North Campus via Niagara Falls Boulevard and Maple Road.

In 2021, it was reported the Washington, D.C. based Douglas Jemal closed on the purchase of the 63-acre site of the mall, and the adjacent Wegmans property for $30 million. Plans call for a property called Boulevard Place.

References

External links
  Boulevard Mall weblink

Shopping malls in New York (state)
Shopping malls established in 1962
Buildings and structures in Erie County, New York
Tourist attractions in Erie County, New York
1962 establishments in New York (state)